Kasada Tabara is a 2021 Tamil-language drama hyperlink film produced jointly by Venkat Prabhu's Black Ticket Company and R. Ravindran of Trident Arts, directed by Chimbu Deven with an ensemble cast and technicians. The film premiered on 27 August 2021 on Sony Liv. The name of the film has 6 letters just like the 6 anthologies that are part of this film. The film credits the editors and cinematographers as director of editing and director of photography respectively.

Anthologies

Cast

Production 
Chimbu Deven's next venture was officially revealed by actor Suriya through the latter's official Twitter handle, which was titled as Kasada Thapara which also carries the film's tagline, Tales Of South Madras. The film will be produced jointly by Venkat Prabhu's Black Ticket Company and R.Ravindran of Trident Arts. Chimbu said that movie is not an anthology, but instead it is a film with a single story encapsulating six portions with the technical team composed of six directors of photography, six editors and six music directors.

Throughout the week after the film title was revealed, several film personalities revealed all the technical teams that will be working on the film through their Twitter handles. A. Sreekar Prasad who earlier works as film editor for Chimbu's Puli film, reveals the team of six editors that will be working on the film: Anthony, Praveen KL, Vivek Harshan, Mu Kasi Viswanathan, Raja Mohammed and Ruben. It was noted that Raja Mohammad earlier had collaborated in two of the director's earlier films before. The next day after the team of film editors have been revealed, cinematographer P. C. Sreeram reveals the team of six cinematographers that will be working on the film: Vijay Milton, M. S. Prabhu, Balasubramaniem, S. R. Kathir, R. D. Rajasekhar, and Sakthi Saravanan. It was noted that S. R. Kathir earlier had collaborated as the cinematographer in director's Oru Kanniyum Moonu Kalavaanikalum film. Later, music director Gangai Amaren reveals the six music directors that will be working on the film, all of them working with the director for the first time: Yuvan Shankar Raja, Santhosh Narayanan, Sam CS, Sean Roldan, Premgi, and Ghibran.

A day after all the cinematographers, editors and music directors was announced, director A.R.Murugadoss had revealed the first look poster alongside the motion poster through his Twitter account. The poster revealed Shantanu Bhagyaraj, Sundeep Kishan, Harish Kalyan, Priya Bhavani Shankar, Venkat Prabhu, Premgi Amaren, Vijayalakshmi and Regina Cassandra acting on the film.

Music 
The soundtrack album features six songs and a composer for each song.

Release & reception 
This film was directly released on 27 August 2021, on Sony Liv.

Times of India wrote "The tones of the individual stories don't always gel well, and this leads to uneven storytelling, unlike in a similarly structured hyperlink movie like Super Deluxe, in which every individual story gloriously came together in enthralling fashion. But to his credit, the director manages to make us care for a few of the characters that we stay invested in the proceedings even when they feel generic." Firstpost wrote "Kasada Thabara works not because of its high-concept foundation but despite it. If you can mentally eliminate the commentary track, the film itself is quite enjoyable".

References

External links 
 

2021 films
Hyperlink films
Films scored by Yuvan Shankar Raja
Films scored by Mohamaad Ghibran
Films scored by Sam C. S.
Films scored by Premgi Amaren
Films scored by Santhosh Narayanan
Films directed by Chimbu Deven
Films not released in theaters due to the COVID-19 pandemic
2021 direct-to-video films
Indian direct-to-video films